Chris Masters is an American professional wrestler.

Chris Masters may also refer to:

Chris Masters (writer) (born 1948), Australian journalist and writer
Chris Masters (DEA agent), group supervisor on Spike TV series DEA